Thomas Matthews (9 February 1905 – 11 May 1990) was an Australian cricketer. He played three first-class matches for Tasmania between 1930 and 1931.

See also
 List of Tasmanian representative cricketers

References

External links
 

1905 births
1990 deaths
Australian cricketers
Tasmania cricketers
Cricketers from Tasmania